Abul Abbas Ahmad ibn Muhammad ibn Abdul-Karim Qassab Amoli [also known as Qassab Amoli] was an 11th-century Iranian Sufi mystic. Coming from Tabaristan, he was of the tribe of Javan and his father was a butcher. Qassab Amoli was a master of Abu al-Hassan al-Kharaqani and Abu Said Abul-Khayr.

References

External links
 His biography in Book
 Khosravani Wisdom in Mersad al-Ibad
 The Status of Abu Al-Abbas Qassab Amuli

Sufi mystics
Iranian Sufis
10th-century Iranian people
11th-century Iranian people
People from Amol